Hadj Mohamed Dahou was one of the founders of the Algerian section of the Letterist International which was based in Chlef.
Dahou was subsequently a member of the Algerian Section of the Situationist International.

He appears under the pseudonym Midhou in Alexander Trocchi's novel Cain's Book.

Texts
 "Manifesto of the Algerian Group of the Lettrist International", with Cheik Ben Dhine and Ait Diafer, Internationale Lettriste #3, August 1953
 "Principles of a new theatre" (unsigned), Internationale Lettriste #3, August 1953
 "Notes for an appeal to the East", Potlatch #6, 27 July 1954

References

Situationists